The men's changquan competition at the 2019 World Wushu Championships in Shanghai, China was held on 21 October at the Minhang Gymnasium.

Results

References

External links
Official website

2019 in martial arts
World Wushu Championships